The Australian International School Malaysia (AISM) is a private international school located in The MINES Resort City, Seri Kembangan, Selangor, Malaysia. 

The school provides a pre-school and K-12 education to its students; and it follows the Australian Curriculum as guided by the New South Wales Board of Studies, Teaching and Educational Standards (BOSTES). It is recognised by the BOSTES and the curriculum leads to the Higher School Certificate (HSC) at Year 12.

Its KL campus is the first certified school in the world where their students learn using the certified Visible Learning™ Approach.

Organisation and teaching staff 

The school is divided into two sub-schools, all on one campus. The sub-schools are Junior and Middle & Senior. Each sub-school is led by a Head of School, who is responsible for the students and staff within it. A Principal leads the whole school supported by the Head of Operations.

A Director of Curriculum and Innovation oversees the curriculum and content in each School, in consultation with the Heads of Schools. A Sports Co-ordinator is responsible for the Sporting and Extra Curricular Programme and the Welfare Co-ordinator oversees the Pastoral care programmes.

Curriculum 

AISM offers an Australian curriculum to all its students.

The Early Learning Centre (Preschool) uses a combination of the Australian Early Years Learning Framework and the Reggio Emilia Approach where children are exposed to a variety of learning experiences based on their interests and needs.

Primary school 
The Key Learning Areas for primary education (Foundation to Year 5) are:

 English (and ESL)
 Mathematics
 Science and Technology
 Human Society and its Environment
 Creative and Performing Arts
 Personal Development, Health and Physical Education

In addition, students study a foreign language other than English - Bahasa Melayu and Mandarin Chinese are offered.

All Junior School students study the Malaysian Language, Culture, Geography and History.

Secondary school 
The Key Learning Areas for secondary education (Years 6 to 10) are:

 English (and ESL)
 Mathematics (all levels)
 Science (Biology, Chemistry and Physics)
 Humanities and Social Science (Geography, History)
 Languages other than English (Bahasa Melayu, Mandarin, Spanish, French)
 Technology and Applied Studies (Design Technology and Information Technology)
 Creative Arts (Drama, Music and Visual Arts)
 Personal Development Health and Physical Education
 Year 6 Enrichment Classes (Advanced Mathematics, Advanced Mandarin and Enrichment Mathematics)

The curriculum allows the school to cater for gifted and talented children who need acceleration programs in one or more disciplines, for students with specific learning difficulties and for children of non-English speaking backgrounds either through specialized programs or through the policy of differentiating the curriculum.

An ESL support programme allows students from non-English speaking backgrounds to improve their English skills in a small group learning situation, and also have help and support during regular lessons with their classmates.

For the pre-university (Years 11 & 12), the students graduated with the New South Wales Higher School Certificate (HSC) at 18 years old. AISM offers a range of courses.

See also 

 List of schools in Selangor

References

External links 
Australian International School Malaysia
NSW Board of Studies

Australian international schools in Malaysia
International schools in Selangor